Friedrich, Prince of Waldeck and Pyrmont (Friedrich Adolf Hermann Fürst zu Waldeck und Pyrmont; 20 January 1865 – 26 May 1946) was the last reigning Prince of Waldeck and Pyrmont from 12 May 1893 to 13 November 1918.

Family
He was the only son and sixth child of George Victor, Prince of Waldeck and Pyrmont and his first wife Princess Helena of Nassau. He was a brother of the Dutch Queen consort Emma and Princess Helena, Duchess of Albany.

His maternal grandparents were William, Duke of Nassau and his second wife Princess Pauline of Württemberg. Pauline was a daughter of Prince Paul of Württemberg and his wife Charlotte of Saxe-Hildburghausen.

Paul was a son of Frederick I of Württemberg and his wife Duchess Augusta of Brunswick-Wolfenbüttel. Augusta was the eldest daughter of Karl Wilhelm Ferdinand, Duke of Brunswick-Lüneburg and Princess Augusta of Great Britain, elder sister of George III of the United Kingdom.

Marriage and children
He married Princess Bathildis of Schaumburg-Lippe, daughter of Prince William of Schaumburg-Lippe and Princess Bathildis of Anhalt-Dessau, in Náchod on 9 August 1895. They had three sons and one daughter:

Josias, Hereditary Prince of Waldeck and Pyrmont (b. 13 May 1896, d. 30 November 1967)
Prince Maximilian Wilhelm Gustav Hermann of Waldeck and Pyrmont (b. 13 September 1898, d. 23 February 1981)
Princess Helena of Waldeck and Pyrmont (b. 22 December 1899, d. 18 February 1948)
Prince Georg Wilhelm Karl Victor of Waldeck and Pyrmont (b. 10 March 1902, d. 14 November 1971)

Honours and awards
 : Grand Cross of the Order of the Württemberg Crown, 1889
  Kingdom of Prussia: Knight of the Order of the Red Eagle, 1st Class, 24 May 1890
 : Grand Cross of the Order of the Crown of Romania
 :
 Knight of the House Order of Fidelity, 1893
 Knight of the Order of Berthold the First, 1893
 : Knight of the Royal Order of Saint Hubert, 1893
 : Knight of the Order of the Rue Crown, 1894
   Sweden-Norway:
 Grand Cross of the Royal Norwegian Order of Saint Olav, 17 June 1894
 Knight of the Royal Order of the Seraphim, 18 September 1897
 : Honorary Knight Grand Cross of the Most Honourable Order of the Bath (military division), 26 April 1904

Ancestry

References

1865 births
1946 deaths
People from Bad Arolsen
People from the Principality of Waldeck and Pyrmont
Princes of Waldeck and Pyrmont
House of Waldeck and Pyrmont
Annulled Honorary Knights Grand Cross of the Order of the Bath
Grand Crosses of the Order of the Crown (Romania)
Generals of Cavalry (Prussia)